Hot Nuts  is the second studio album released by British hard rock band Tokyo Dragons.

Track listing
 "On Your Marks" - 4:21
 "Keeping the Wolf from the Door" - 3:44
 "If I Run, You Run" - 4:18
 "Killing Everybody You Meet" - 4:38
 "Rock My Boat" - 5:18
 "On Fuel" - 2:14
 "Slayed Alive" - 6:10
 "Ramblin' Jack" - 3:51
 "Couldn't I Just Tell You" - 3:35
 "The Ballad of Ballard" - 4:51

Personnel
 Steve Lomax - rhythm/lead guitars, lead vocals
 Mal Bruk - lead/rhythm guitars,  backing vocals
 Mathias Stady - bass 
 Phil Martini - drums, backing vocals

2007 albums
Tokyo Dragons albums